Medicine Hat—Cardston—Warner (formerly Medicine Hat) is a federal electoral district in southern Alberta, Canada, that has been represented in the House of Commons of Canada since 1908.

Following the 2012 federal electoral redistribution, the riding was renamed Medicine Hat—Cardston—Warner.

In 2016, 34.9% of the population of the Medicine Hat constituency were of German ethnic origin, one of the highest percentages in all of Canada.

In the 42nd Canadian Parliament, the seat was represented by Jim Hillyer of the Conservative Party of Canada until his death on 23 March 2016. In the first by-election in the history of the Medicine Hat constituency held on 24 October 2016, Glen Motz of the Conservatives was elected. Motz has been the riding's representative to Ottawa since then.

Geography
The constituency covers the City of Medicine Hat and surrounding areas in the southeast corner and southern U.S. border region of Alberta, including Cypress County, the County of Forty Mile No. 8, Warner No. 5 and the Town of Warner, and Cardston County and the Town of Cardston.

Demographics
According to the Canada 2011 Census

Ethnic groups: 87.5% White, 8.9% Indigenous
Languages: 86.4% English, 7.4% German, 1.2% French, ~1.1% Blackfoot (Blackfoot/Kainai counted as "Other language" on the Census; this number derived from "other language" speakers on Blackfoot/Kainai First Nations)
Religions: 72.0% Christian (21.4% Catholic, 9.6% United Church, 6.1% Lutheran, 3.6% Anglican, 2.2% Pentecostal, 1.5% Baptist, 27.6% Other Christian), 1.2% Traditional Indigenous Spirituality, 25.6% None.
Median income: $29,534 (2010) 
Average income: $39,940 (2010)

History
Soon after the province of Alberta was admitted to Confederation in 1905, this electoral district was created – in 1907 – from Alberta (Provisional District) and Assiniboia West ridings.

During the 2012 electoral redistribution, "Medicine Hat" was largely succeeded by "Medicine Hat—Cardston—Warner", losing territory to Bow River and Battle River—Crowfoot, and gaining territory from Lethbridge and Macleod.

Members of Parliament

Election results

Medicine Hat—Cardston—Warner, 2013–present

Medicine Hat, 1907–2013

 	

Note: Change based on redistributed results. Conservative vote is compared to the total of Progressive Conservative and Canadian Alliance vote in 2000.

Note: Canadian Alliance vote is compared to the Reform vote in 1997.

Note: Change based on redistributed results.

See also
 List of Canadian federal electoral districts
 Past Canadian electoral districts

References
 
 
 Expenditures – 2008
 Expenditures – 2004
 Expenditures – 2000
 Expenditures – 1997

Notes

External links
 Elections Canada
 Website of the Parliament of Canada

Alberta federal electoral districts
County of Forty Mile No. 8
County of Warner No. 5
Cardston County
Cardston
Cypress County
Politics of Medicine Hat
Raymond, Alberta